In mathematics, a Clifford module is a representation of a Clifford algebra. In general a Clifford algebra C is a central simple algebra over some field extension L of the field K over which the quadratic form Q defining C is defined.

The abstract theory of Clifford modules was founded by a paper of M. F. Atiyah, R. Bott and Arnold S. Shapiro. A fundamental result on Clifford modules is that the Morita equivalence class of a Clifford algebra (the equivalence class of the category of Clifford modules over it) depends only on the signature . This is an algebraic form of Bott periodicity.

Matrix representations of real Clifford algebras
We will need to study anticommuting matrices because in Clifford algebras orthogonal vectors anticommute

For the real Clifford algebra , we need  mutually anticommuting matrices, of which p have +1 as square and q have −1 as square.

Such a basis of gamma matrices is not unique. One can always obtain another set of gamma matrices satisfying the same Clifford algebra by means of a similarity transformation.

where S is a non-singular matrix. The sets γa′ and γa belong to the same equivalence class.

Real Clifford algebra R3,1

Developed by Ettore Majorana, this Clifford module enables the construction of a Dirac-like equation without complex numbers, and its elements are called Majorana spinors.

The four basis vectors are the three Pauli matrices and a fourth antihermitian matrix.  The signature is (+++−).  For the signatures (+−−−) and (−−−+) often used in physics, 4×4 complex matrices or 8×8 real matrices are needed.

See also 
 Weyl–Brauer matrices
 Higher-dimensional gamma matrices
 Clifford module bundle

References

 . See also the programme website for a preliminary version.
 .
 .

Representation theory
Clifford algebras